Mykola Nakonechnyi (born 10 September 1981) is a retired Ukrainian football player.

Honors 
 Pirveli Liga: 2010–2011
 Georgian Cup: 2010–2011

See also
 2001 FIFA World Youth Championship squads#Ukraine

External links
 Profile at uefa.com 
 Ukrainian Football Federation 
 

1981 births
Living people
Ukrainian footballers
Ukraine under-21 international footballers
Ukraine youth international footballers
Ukrainian Premier League players
FC Borysfen Boryspil players
FC Obolon-Brovar Kyiv players
FC Arsenal Kyiv players
Ukrainian expatriate footballers
Expatriate footballers in Georgia (country)
People from Nikopol, Ukraine
Association football midfielders
Sportspeople from Dnipropetrovsk Oblast